Talmadge "Ike" Hill (born April 15, 1947) is an American former football defensive back who played five season in the National Football League (NFL) for the Buffalo Bills, Chicago Bears and Miami Dolphins from 1970 to 1976. Hill played in a total of 49 career games.

References

Living people
1947 births
Buffalo Bills players
Chicago Bears players
Miami Dolphins players
American football defensive backs
Catawba Indians football players
American football return specialists